Ye with grave (Ѐ ѐ; italics: Ѐ ѐ) is a regular combination of Cyrillic letter Ye (Е е) and grave accent. Although this combination is not considered a separate letter in the alphabet of any language, it has its own individual position in certain computer encodings, such as Unicode.

Usage
Ye with grave represents a stressed variant of the Cyrillic letter Ye (Е е), but it is a Ye with acute accent in Russian to indicate stress.

It is used mainly in Macedonian to prevent ambiguity in certain cases: "" = "And do not lead us into temptation, but deliver us from evil", or "" = "All that you'll write can be used (literally: it can use itself) against you", etc.

It can also be found in accented Bulgarian, Serbian or Church Slavonic texts as well as in older (19th-century or earlier) Russian books. Recently, Russian stressed vowels are typically marked with the acute accent instead of the grave accent, and the role of grave accent is limited to the secondary stress mark in certain dictionaries (acute accent shows the main stress):  (pseudosphere).

Computing codes

Related letters and other similar characters
Ё ё : Cyrillic letter Yo
Є є : Cyrillic letter Ukrainian Ye
Ԑ ԑ : Cyrillic letter Reversed Ze
Э э : Cyrillic letter E
E e : Latin letter E
È è : Latin letter È — a variant of ⟨e⟩ used in languages including French, Italian and Scottish Gaelic

References

Cyrillic letters with diacritics
Letters with grave

es:Е#Variante